The second season of That '70s Show, an American television series, began September 28, 1999, and ended on May 22, 2000. It aired on Fox. The region 1 DVD was released on April 19, 2005. This season is set entirely in the year 1977.

Cast

Main 
Topher Grace as Eric Forman
Mila Kunis as Jackie Burkhart
Ashton Kutcher as Michael Kelso
Danny Masterson as Steven Hyde
Laura Prepon as Donna Pinciotti
Wilmer Valderrama as Fez
Debra Jo Rupp as Kitty Forman
Kurtwood Smith as Red Forman
Tanya Roberts as Midge Pinciotti
Don Stark as Bob Pinciotti
Lisa Robin Kelly as Laurie Forman

Special appearance
Paul Anka as himself
Lyle Waggoner as himself
Bob Eubanks as himself

Special guest 
Marion Ross as Bernice Forman
Tommy Chong as Leo
Melissa Joan Hart as Mary

Recurring
Paul Connor as Timmy Thompson

Guest
Neil Flynn as the Bouncer
Stephen Tobolowsky as The Professor
Lindsay Sloane as Patty
Jenilee Harrison as Carol
Richard Kline as Ted
Amy Adams as Kat Peterson
Maud Adams as Holly
Kristina Wayborn as Honor
Barbara Carrera as Barbara
Kevin McDonald as Pastor Dave Rogers
Mac Davis as St. Peter

Episodes

References 

 That '70s Show Episode Guide at The New York Times

External links 
 
 

1999 American television seasons
2000 American television seasons
Television series set in 1977
2